Julie Crane (born 1976) is a former British track and field athlete who specialised in the high jump. She won a Silver medal at the 2006 Commonwealth Games.

Crane was born in Nottingham but represented Wales and Sale Harriers. Crane graduated from the University of Birmingham with an MSc in Mathematical Sciences in 1999.

She won a silver medal representing Wales in the Women's High Jump at the 2006 Commonwealth Games. She also represented Wales in the Women's High Jump at the 1998 Commonwealth Games in Kuala Lumpur, Malaysia, and the 2002 Commonwealth Games in Manchester, England. She is the Welsh record holder for both Indoor and Outdoor High Jump. Crane represented Great Britain at the 2005 European Athletics Indoor Championships – Women's high jump.

Crane suffered back problems following a car crash in 2004. Crane announced her retirement from athletics due to injury in 2010.

References

Living people
1976 births
Sportspeople from Nottingham
British female high jumpers
Welsh high jumpers
Welsh female athletes
Commonwealth Games silver medallists for Wales
Commonwealth Games medallists in athletics
Athletes (track and field) at the 1998 Commonwealth Games
Athletes (track and field) at the 2002 Commonwealth Games
Athletes (track and field) at the 2006 Commonwealth Games
Alumni of the University of Birmingham
Medallists at the 2006 Commonwealth Games